The following lists events that happened in 1961 in Iceland.

Incumbents
President – Ásgeir Ásgeirsson
Prime Minister – Ólafur Thors, Bjarni Benediktsson

Events

Births

4 January – Gunnar Gíslason, footballer
4 April – Gyrðir Elíasson, writer
23 April – Þröstur Leó Gunnarsson, actor
30 April – Arnór Guðjohnsen, footballer
23 July – Kristján Arason, handball player.
12 December – Lárus Guðmundsson, footballer
13 December – Guðmundur Torfason, footballer

Full date missing
Arnaldur Indriðason, writer of crime fiction

Deaths

References

 
1960s in Iceland
Iceland
Iceland
Years of the 20th century in Iceland